The Changan Eado DT is a subcompact sedan produced by Changan Automobile. Originally called the Alsvin V7 before the 2018 facelift, the Eado DT subcompact sits above the Alsvin V5 subcompact sedan.

Alsvin V7

The Alsvin V7 or Yuexiang V7 is the successor of the Alsvin subcompact sedan and also succeeding the Alsvin V5. Standing on a completely new platform adding a new 1.6L four-cylinder engine as a new option, the styling of the Alsvin V7 was also updated with Changan's latest design language. Price ranges from 60.900 yuan to 86.900 yuan. The Yuexiang V7 debuted in August 2014 on the 2014 Chengdu Auto Show.

Changan Eado DT

Debuting at the Beijing's Auto Show in April 2018, the Changan Eado DT is positioned to be the entry model of the Eado family under the Changan Eado/Eado XT compact car. Being essentially a rebadged Alsvin V7, the dimensions are basically the same as that of the Alsvin V7.
The Eado DT is equipped with the same engines from the Alsvin V7. A naturally aspirated 1.6 liter engine producing 124 hp and a 1.5 liter turbocharged engine producing 170 hp mated to either a 5-speed manual or a 5-speed automatic transmission.

References

External links 

 

Cars introduced in 2014
2010s cars
Cars of China
Front-wheel-drive vehicles
Alsvin V7
Subcompact cars
Sedans